Muttamsetti Srinivasa Rao, popularly known as Avanthi Srinivas, is an Indian educationalist turned politician.

He was the Member of the Legislative Assembly from Bheemili, Andhra Pradesh. He operates Avanthi Education Institutes in Andhra Pradesh and Telangana under Avanthi Educational Society, Visakhapatnam. He won the 2014 Indian general election as a  candidate.

Personal life 
He was born on 12 Jun 1967 to Muttamsetti Venkata Narayana and Smt. Muttamsetti Nageswaramma. He married Smt. M. Gnaneswari on 20 Jun 1986 and has 2 children – 1 daughter: Priyanka, 1 son: Nandish.

Political career 
He was a member of the Andhra Pradesh Legislative Assembly between 2009 and 2014. In May 2014, he was elected to 16th Lok Sabha. At the Lok Sabha, he was the member of the Rules Committee; Standing Committee on Industry and the Consultative Committee, Ministry of Human Resource Development.

On 14 February 2019, he quit the TDP to join the YSRCP.

He was elected in Bheemili constituency as member of legislative assembly for the second time in the 2019 elections. He had also won in the same constituency in the 2009. He was appointed Minister for Tourism, Culture and Youth Advancement of Andhra Pradesh.

Assembly elections 2019

References

India MPs 2014–2019
Living people
Politicians from Visakhapatnam
Lok Sabha members from Andhra Pradesh
Telugu Desam Party politicians
Businesspeople from Visakhapatnam
1967 births
Telugu politicians
Businesspeople from Andhra Pradesh
Andhra Pradesh MLAs 2019–2024
Indian National Congress politicians from Andhra Pradesh
YSR Congress Party politicians